Hydrodynastes gigas is a New World species of large, rear-fanged, Dipsadin snake endemic to South America. It is commonly and alternatively known as the false water cobra and the Brazilian smooth snake.   The false water cobra is so named because when the snake is threatened it "hoods" as a true cobra (Naja species) does.  Unlike a true cobra, though, it does not rear up, but remains in a horizontal position. No subspecies are currently recognized as being valid.

Common names
Hydrodynastes gigas is commonly referred to as the false water cobra, false cobra, South American water cobra, and Brazilian smooth snake.  In South America, it is sometimes referred to as boipevassu. Additional South American common names include mboi-peba, ñacaniná, surucucu-do-pantanal, vibora ladradora (barking snake), and yacanina.

Description
H. gigas is a large dipsadidae snake that may exceed 3 m (9 to 10 ft) in total length (including tail) when adult. Most H. gigas snakes reach about 2 m (6 to 7 ft) in total length. Males are typically much smaller than females in this species. The common name false water cobra is an allusion to its ability to flatten its neck, similar to a cobra, as a defensive reaction to make it look larger and more intimidating. Unlike the true cobra, though, the false water cobra stays in a horizontal position when it hoods, rather than rearing into a vertical position. H. gigas can flatten not only its neck, but also lower down its body, which is not possible for a true cobra.

Additionally, the pattern and coloration of this Hydrodynastes species superficially resemble those of true water cobras (Boulengerina).  The false water cobra has large eyes with circular pupils, allowing good daytime vision. The tongue is black, and of the typical snake fashion.

The background colour of a mature specimen is an olive green or brown, with dark spots and bands covering much of its body. The background coloring and banding generally become darker towards the tail. This colouring gives the false water cobra effective camouflage in its natural rainforest environment. The ventral scales are yellow or brown, spotted with dark flecks that make three dotted lines, which appear to merge towards the tail.  Mehrtens, 1987, suggested females are brown ventrally, whilst males are yellow. Females are suggested to have lighter bands and markings on their bodies. This is not an effective way of judging the sex of H. gigas, as coloring  differs slightly between all individuals. Hatchlings and juveniles are much darker in coloration and do not have the typical dark eyes of the adults. They more resemble a garter or water snake than their mature counterparts. In captivity, hypomelanstic animals have been produced. These animals vary in coloration, from some having only slightly lighter colored saddles, to those that are almost patternless. A melanistic population found in Tocantins, central Brazil, was originally describe as a new species of Hydrodynastes, H. melanogigas, but genetic evidence indicates that this population is composed of melanistic H. gigas.

Geographic range
In South America, H. gigas is found from eastern Bolivia to southern Brazil, and in Paraguay and Argentina.

Habitat
H. gigas generally lives in wet, humid areas, and marshlands, typically within the tropical rainforests that are common within its range. However, the false water cobra has also been observed in dryer areas, although this is not its preferred habitat. The preference of wetlands as a habitat for H. gigas contributes to its common name of false "water" cobra.

Behavior
H. gigas is primarily a diurnal species. It is also a very active and inquisitive snake, which  spends much of the day climbing, burrowing, and even swimming. Temperaments can vary considerably between specimens; some are very docile and reluctant to bite, whilst others are very defensive and even aggressive or intimidating. Captive-bred specimens can become quite tame and trusting, and many exhibit a high level of intelligence.

Feeding
In the wild, H. gigas primarily feeds on fish and amphibians, but will take small mammals, rodents, birds, and even other reptiles. In captivity, they can be introduced to other types of food, as well.

Venom
The posterior maxillary teeth of H. gigas are enlarged, and the Duvernoy's gland produces a secretion with high proteolytic activity. Besides the ability of this large and powerful snake to inflict mechanical trauma, numerous cases of local envenomation and perhaps hypersensitivity have occurred, most of which have gone unreported. Prolonged, chewing bites may result in painful (sometimes extensive and persistent) swelling, as well as bruising. Nevertheless, the species is regularly kept as a pet, becoming increasingly popular in recent years.

Manning et al. (1999) described a case in which an 18-year-old male pet-store employee was bitten on the wrist by a specimen that hung on for 1.5 minutes. Some mild swelling resulted, but after nine hours, the victim claimed to have experienced three bouts of muscle paralysis, during which he fell and was unable to move or speak, but a medical examination did not produce any unusual results. The symptoms described possibly were the result of anxiety. The liquid venom yield ranges from 0-50 microliters and the solid venom yield is 1.3 mg.

Taxonomy
This species was once considered to constitute a single monotypic genus, Cyclagras

References

Further reading
Boulenger GA (1894). Catalogue of the Snakes in the British Museum (Natural History). Volume II., Containing the Conclusion of the Colubridæ Aglyphæ. London: Trustees of the British Museum (Natural History). (Taylor and Francis, printers). xi + 382 pp. + Plates I-XX. (Genus Cyclagras and species Cyclagras gigas, p. 144).
Duméril A-M-C, Bibron G, Duméril A[-H-A] (1854). Erpétology générale ou histoire naturelle complète des reptiles. Tome septième. Première partie. [= General Herpetology or Complete Natural History of the Reptiles. Volume 7. Part 1.] Paris: Roret. xvii + 780 pp. (Xenodon gigas, pp. 761–763).

External links

Hydrodynastes
Snakes of South America
Reptiles of Argentina
Reptiles of Bolivia
Reptiles of Brazil
Reptiles of Paraguay
Fauna of the Pantanal
Taxa named by Gabriel Bibron
Taxa named by André Marie Constant Duméril
Taxa named by Auguste Duméril
Reptiles described in 1854